.ke is the Internet country code top-level domain (ccTLD) for Kenya.

Second-level domains
Second-level domains, under which domains are registered at the third level, are:

 .co.ke: for companies
 .or.ke: for not-for-profit-making organisations or NGO's
 .ne.ke: for network devices
 .go.ke: for Government entities. Requires supporting documents
 .ac.ke: for institutions of higher education. Requires supporting documents
 .sc.ke: for lower and middle institutes of learning. Requires supporting documents
 .me.ke: for personal names/websites
 .mobi.ke: for mobile content
 .info.ke: for informational content

See also
 Internet in Kenya

References

External links
 IANA .ke whois information
 .ke domain registration website

Country code top-level domains
Communications in Kenya

sv:Toppdomän#K